A bicycle's performance is extraordinarily efficient. In terms of the amount of energy a person must expend to travel a given distance, cycling is calculated to be the most efficient self-powered means of transportation.  
In terms of the ratio of cargo weight a bicycle can carry to total weight, it is also the most efficient means of cargo transportation.

Mechanical efficiency
From a mechanical viewpoint, up to 99% of the energy delivered by the rider into the pedals is transmitted to the wheels (clean, lubricated new chain at 400 W), although the use of gearing mechanisms reduces this by 1–7% (clean, well-lubricated derailleurs), 4–12% (chain with 3-speed hubs), or 10–20% (shaft drive with 3-speed hubs). The higher efficiencies in each range are achieved at higher power levels and in direct drive (hub gears) or with large driven cogs (derailleurs).

Energy efficiency
 
Air drag, which increases with the square of speed, requires increasingly higher power outputs relative to speed. A bicycle in which the rider lies in a supine position is referred to as a recumbent bicycle or, if covered in an aerodynamic fairing to achieve very low air drag, as a velomobile.

That same person on a bicycle, on the same ground, with the same power output, can travel at  using an ordinary bicycle, so in these conditions the energy expenditure of cycling is one-third that of walking the same distance. Uphill and downhill speeds vary according to the slope of the incline and the effort of the rider. Uphill cycling requires more power to overcome gravity and speeds are therefore lower and heartrate is higher than during flat riding conditions. With medium effort a cyclist can pedal 8-10 km/h up a gentle incline. Riding on grass, sand, mud, or snow will also slow a rider down. Without pedaling downhill a bicycle rider can easily reach speeds of 20-40 km/h down a gentle 5% slope and speeds exceeding 50 km/h on steeper inclines.

Energy output
Active humans can produce between 1.5 Watts per kilogram of body mass (untrained), 3.0 W/kg (fit), and 6.6 W/kg (top-class male athletes). 5 W/kg is about the level reachable by the highest tier of male amateurs for longer periods. Maximum sustained power levels during one hour range from about 200 W (NASA experimental group of "healthy men") to 500 W (men's world hour record).

Energy input
The energy input to the human body is in the form of food energy, usually quantified in kilocalories [kcal] or kiloJoules [kJ=kWs]. This can be related to a certain distance travelled and to body weight, giving units such as kJ/(km∙kg). The rate of food consumption, i.e. the amount consumed during a certain period of time, is the input power. This can be measured in kcal/day or in J/s = W (1000 kcal/d ~ 48.5 W).

This input power can be determined by measuring oxygen uptake, or in the long term food consumption, assuming no change of weight. This includes the power needed just for living, called the basal metabolic rate BMR or roughly the resting metabolic rate.

The required food can also be calculated by dividing the output power by the muscle efficiency. This is 18–26%. From the example above, if a 70 kg person is cycling at 15 km/h by expending 60 W and a muscular efficiency of 20% is assumed, roughly 1 kJ/(km∙kg) extra food is required. For calculating the total food required during the trip, the BMR must first be added to the input power. If the 70 kg person is an old, short woman, her BMR could be 60 W, in all other cases a bit higher. Viewed this way the efficiency in this example is effectively halved and roughly 2 kJ/(km∙kg) total food is required.

Although this shows a large relative increase in food required for low power cycling, in practice it is hardly noticed, as the extra energy cost of an hour's cycling can be covered with 50 g nuts or chocolate. With long and fast or uphill cycling, the extra food requirement however becomes evident.

To complete the efficiency calculation, the type of food consumed determines the overall efficiency. For this the energy needed to produce, distribute and cook the food must be considered.

Typical speeds
 

In utility cycling there is a large variation; an elderly person on an upright roadster might do less than  while a fitter or younger person could easily do twice that on the same bicycle.
The fitness and cadence of the rider, bicycle tire pressure and sizes, gear ratios, slope of the terrain affect the overall speed of the rider. Bicycles designed for flat urban environments may have fixed gearing or three speeds and bicycles designed for hilly terrain, hauling weight, or traveling faster have more gears.
In competitive cycling a sustainable high speed is augmented by the addition of more gears, using larger chainrings, lighter materials, aerodynamic design, and the aerodynamic effects of the peloton. The group can maintain a much higher speed over extended distance due to various cyclists taking turns at the head of the wind then dropping behind to rest. A team time trial produces the same effect. 

Modern cyclists use a speedometer or cyclocomputer to measure, record, and share several variables including speed, gradient, distance, time, cadence, slope, Watts, power, temperature, GPS data, route, and even heart rate.

Cycling speed records
The highest speed officially recorded for any human-powered vehicle (HPV) on level ground and with calm winds and without external aids (such as motor pacing and wind-blocks, but including a defined amount of gravity assist) is  set in 2016 by Todd Reichert in the Eta Speedbike, a streamlined recumbent bicycle. In the 1989 Race Across America, a group of HPVs crossed the United States in just 5 days. That record was set in 1986 by Jim Glover on a Moulton AM7 at the Human Powered Speed Championships during Expo86 World Fair in Vancouver. The fastest bicycle speed in slipstream is 296 km/h (183.9 mph), set by Denise Mueller-Korenek in 2018 on the Bonneville Salt Flats. This involved slipstreaming behind a dragster.

Cycling Speed Wobble
Dangerous steering wobble may occur at high speeds, riding with no hands on the handle bars at lower speeds, and when the front forks are weighted with panniers.

Reduction of weight and rotating mass
 
There has been major corporate competition to lower the weight of racing bikes in order to be faster uphill and accelerating. The UCI sets a limit of 6.8 kg on the minimum weight of bicycles to be used in sanctioned races.

Advantages of reduced mass
For cycling on the level at a constant speed, a large weight reduction saves only a negligible amount of power and it is on the contrary beneficial to add mass in the form of aerodynamic improvements. But for climbing steeply, any weight reduction can be felt directly. E.g., a reduction of 10% of the total system weight (bicycle, rider, and luggage combined) will save nearly 10% power.

A reduced mass is also directly felt when accelerating. For example, the Analytic Cycling calculator  gives a time/distance advantage of 0.16 s/188 cm for a sprinter with 500 g lighter wheels. In a criterium race, if a rider has to brake entering each corner, then this is wasted as heat.  For a flat criterium at 40 km/h, 1 km circuit, 4 corners per lap, 10 km/h speed loss at each corner, one hour duration, there would be 160 corner "jumps". For 90 kg rider and bike, this adds roughly one third effort compared to the same ride at a steady speed, and a mass reduction of 10% of the total system weight (bicycle, rider, and luggage combined) could thus give about a 3% advantage.

Advantages of light wheels
The mass of tires and rims must be accelerated linearly and rotationally. It can be shown that the effect of rim and tire mass of typical spoked wheels is effectively doubled.
Reducing their mass is thus especially noticeable in the case of sprints and corner "jumps" in a criterium.

Power required
 
Heated debates over the relative importance of weight saving and optimization of tires and aerodynamics are common in cycling. By calculating the power requirements for moving a bike and rider, one can evaluate the relative energy costs of air resistance, rolling resistance, slope resistance and acceleration.

There are well-known equations that give the power required to overcome the various resistances mainly as a function of speed:

Air drag
The power  needed to overcome air drag or resistance is:

 in still air, or

 in a headwind,

where
 is the air density, which is about 1.225 kg/m^3 at sea level and 15 deg. C.
 is the speed relative to the road,
 is the apparent headwind, and
 is a characteristic area times its associated drag coefficient.

The concept of apparent wind is only directly applicable here if it comes from a true headwind or tailwind. If this difference is negative,  must be regarded as assistance rather than resistance. If however the wind has a sideways component, the apparent wind must be calculated with a vector sum and, especially if the bicycle is streamlined, the calculation of lateral and drag forces becomes more complex; a proper treatment involves considering the forces on the surfaces like the forces on sails.

However, if  is the cross sectional area,  can be roughly approximated as 1 for usual cycling speeds of a rider on an upright bicycle.

Rolling resistance
The power  for overcoming the tires' rolling resistances is given by:

where g is gravity, nominally 9.8 m/s^2,
and m is mass (kg).
The approximation can be used with all normal coefficients of rolling resistance . Measurements on a roller-mechanism give low-speed coefficients of 0.003 to 0.006 for a variety of tires inflated to their maximum recommended pressures, increasing about 50% at 10 m/s.

Climbing power
The vertical climbing power  on slope  is given by

.

This approximation approaches the real solution for small, i.e. normal grades. For extremely steep slopes such as 0.35 the approximation gives an overestimation of about 6%.

As this power is used to increase the potential energy of bike and rider, it is returned as motive power when going downhill and not lost unless the rider brakes or travels faster than desired.

Power for acceleration
The power  for accelerating the bike and rider having total mass m with acceleration a and rotationally also the wheels having mass  is:

The approximation is valid if  is assumed to be concentrated at the rims and tires and these are not slipping. The mass of such wheels can thus be counted twice for this calculation, independent of the wheels' sizes.

As this power is used to increase the kinetic energy of bike and rider, it is returned when decelerating and not lost unless the rider brakes or travels faster than desired.

Total power

where  is the mechanical efficiency of the drive train described at the beginning of this article.

Given this simplified equation, one can calculate some values of interest. For example, assuming no wind, one gets the following results for power delivered to the pedals (watts):

 175 W for a 90 kg bike + rider to go 9 m/s (32 km/h or 20 mph) on the flat (76% of effort to overcome aerodynamic drag), or 2.6 m/s (9.4 km/h or 5.8 mph) on a 7% grade (2.1% of effort to overcome aerodynamic drag).
 300 W for a 90 kg bike + rider at 11 m/s (40 km/h or 25 mph) on the flat (83% of effort to overcome aerodynamic drag) or 4.3 m/s (15 km/h or 9.5 mph) on a 7% grade (4.2% of effort to overcome aerodynamic drag).
 165 W for a 65 kg bike + rider to go 9 m/s (32 km/h or 20 mph) on the flat (82% of effort to overcome aerodynamic drag), or 3.3 m/s (12 km/h or 7.4 mph) on a 7% grade (3.7% of effort to overcome aerodynamic drag).
 285 W for a 65 kg bike + rider at 11 m/s (40 km/h or 25 mph) on the flat (87% of effort to overcome aerodynamic drag) or 5.3 m/s (19 km/h or 12 mph) on a 7% grade (6.1% of effort to overcome aerodynamic drag).

Reducing the weight of the bike + rider by 1 kg would increase speed by 0.01 m/s at 9 m/s on the flat (5 seconds in a 32 km/h (20 mph), 40-kilometre (25 mile) TT). The same reduction on a 7% grade would be worth 0.04 m/s (90 kg bike + rider) to 0.07 m/s (65 kg bike + rider). For reference, the big climbs in the Tour de France and the Giro d'Italia have the following average grades:

Giro d'Italia
 Stelvio Pass = 7.45% over 24.3 km;
 Colle delle Finestre = 9.1% over 18.6 km;
 Colle dell'Agnello = 6.5% over 22 km;
 Passolanciano-Maielletta, also known as Blockhaus = 9.4% over 22 km;
 Plan de Corones = 10% over 5.2 km;
 Mortirolo = 10.4% over 12.5 km;
 Monte Zoncolan = 12% over 10.1 km;

Tour de France
 Tourmalet = 7%
 Galibier = 7.5%
 Alpe D'Huez = 8.6%
 Mont Ventoux = 7.1%.

See also
Bicycle
Bicycle and motorcycle dynamics
Cycling power meter
Cyclocomputer
 Outline of cycling

References

External links
 Physics-based simulation of bicycle race performance 
 Calculate the speed and power requirements of different sprocket sizes for different Hub and Derailleur gears

Cycling